The Romance of an Old Maid is a 1912 American short film directed by Otis Turner and starring King Baggot and Rolinda Bainbridge (in the title role) with Gladys Egan and William E. Shay as supporting cast. It was produced by the Independent Moving Pictures Company of New York.

External links
 

1912 films
1912 comedy-drama films
American silent short films
American black-and-white films
1912 short films
1910s American films
Silent American comedy-drama films
1910s English-language films
Comedy-drama short films